The Twelfth Doctor comic stories consisted of several regularly published titles: Doctor Who Magazine, Doctor Who Adventures and Doctor Who: The Twelfth Doctor from Titan Comics.

Comics

Doctor Who Magazine

Doctor Who Adventures

Immediate Media Company

Panini

Titan Comics

Summer Events

Doctor Who Annuals

See also 
 List Of Doctor Who Comic Stories
 First Doctor Comic Stories
 Second Doctor Comic Stories
 Third Doctor Comic Stories
 Fourth Doctor Comic Strips
 Fifth Doctor Comic Stories
 Sixth Doctor Comic Stories
 Seventh Doctor Comic Stories
 Eighth Doctor Comic Stories
 Ninth Doctor Comic Stories
 Tenth Doctor Comic Stories
 Eleventh Doctor Comic Stories

Comics based on Doctor Who
Twelfth Doctor stories